Sardinops is a monotypic genus of sardines of the family Clupeidae. The only member of the genus is Sardinops sagax. It is found in the Indo-Pacific and East Pacific oceans. It has numerous common or vernacular names, some of which more appropriately refer to subspecies, including blue pilchard, Australian pilchard (S. s. neopilchardus), blue-bait, Californian pilchard (S. s. caeruleus), Peruvian Pacific sardine (S. s. sagax), South American pilchard, Chilean sardine (S. s. sagax), Japanese pilchard (S. s. melanostictus), Pacific sardine, and Southern African pilchard (S. s. ocellatus).

South Australian sardine fishery 

The South Australian sardine fishery targets Sardinops sagax and is the highest yielding single species fishery in Australia by volume. The fishery employs the technique of purse seining. Schools of sardines are encircled by a net up to 1 kilometre in length which is then drawn closed at the bottom. The catch is then pumped on board the fishing vessel where it is stored in refrigerated holds at below freezing temperatures. 94% of the catch is used as feed in Southern bluefin tuna ranching operations off Port Lincoln, South Australia. The remaining 6% of the catch serves human consumption, recreational fishing bait and premium pet food markets.

A key area of concern for industry compliance in 2004 was quota evasion. Quota evasion had previously occurred in several forms: unloading catch directly to tuna farms, failing to report prior to unloading catch and dumping excess catch at sea.

Gallery

See also
 Sardine run
 Southern bluefin tuna

References

External links
 
 Australian Sardine @ Fishes of Australia

Clupeinae
Western American coastal fauna
Marine fauna of Southern Africa
Fish of Madagascar
Fish of Australia
Fish of East Asia
Marine fish of Australia
Fish of Oceania
Monotypic fish genera
Commercial fish
Taxa named by Leonard Jenyns
Fish described in 1842
Articles containing video clips